Colmcille Gaelic Football Club is a Gaelic football and ladies' Gaelic football club based in Aughnacliffe, County Longford, Ireland.

History
Colmcille GFC is named for Saint Colmcille (or Saint Columba) (AD 521–597) who founded Inchmore monastery on nearby Lough Gowna. The club won the very first Longford Senior Football Championship in 1890 as Columbkille St. Columbkilles. They have won six more county senior titles since then, the latest in 2022.

Colmcille was one of the first five ladies' Gaelic football teams in Longford, first playing in 1980.

They play at Fr. Phil McGee Park in Aghacordrinan, south of Aughnacliffe.

Honours

Gaelic football
 Longford Senior Football Championship (7): 1890, 1938, 1949, 1952, 1958, 2008, 2022
 Longford Senior Football League (Leader Cup) (3): 1954, 1957, 1990
 Longford Senior ACFL Division 1 (3): 1990, 2020, 2022
 Longford Intermediate Football Championship (1): 1986
 Longford Junior Football Championship (4): 1937, 1979, 1998, 2020
 Longford U-21 Football Championship (4): 2001, 2002, 2003, 2015 
 Longford Minor Football Championship (3): 1953, 1962, 1963
 Longford Juvenile Football Championship (3): 1955, 1960, 1997
 Longford Ladies Intermediate Football Championship (2): 2011, 2021
 Longford Ladies Junior Football Championship (2): 2010, 2019
 Longford Ladies Juvenile Football Championship (2): 1999, 2000
 Longford Ladies U-14 Football Championship (2): 1998, 1999

Notable people
Eugene McGee

References

Gaelic football clubs in County Longford